Claude Dasse (born 7 July 1964 in Paris) is a French bobsledder who competed in the early 1990s. Competing in two Winter Olympics, he earned his best finish of eighth in the four-man event at Albertville in 1992.

References
 1992 bobsleigh two-man results
 1992 bobsleigh four-man results
 1994 bobsleigh four-man results

1964 births
Bobsledders at the 1992 Winter Olympics
Bobsledders at the 1994 Winter Olympics
French male bobsledders
Olympic bobsledders of France
Living people